Highway Nights is a 2022 Indian drama short film directed by Shubham S Singh. Prakash Jha and Mazel Vyas play the lead roles.

Premise 
The plot revolves around a truck driver who gives a lift to a young female sex worker, and learns her story. It is inspired by interviews with sex workers who look for customers along Indian highways.

Cast 
 Prakash Jha as Sitaram 
 Mazel Vyas as Manju

References

External links
 

Indian short films